German submarine U-2321 was the first of the highly advanced Type XXIII U-boats built for Nazi Germany's Kriegsmarine in 1944 and 1945. As the first of this class, U-2321 was one of a handful of such boats to undertake an operational patrol, in March 1945. She was successful in this operation, and sank a British freighter, one of just five ships sunk by the new fully submarine (as opposed to just submersible) boats.

She was constructed as an experiment in Hamburg and her small size meant that she was completed in just four months, following which she conducted extensive trials in the Baltic Sea and off the Norwegian coast in an effort to gain an idea of the capabilities of the boat. In this duty, and through her entire life, U-2321 was commanded by Oberleutnant zur See Hans-Heinrich Barschkis. By the first few months of 1945, with the war drawing to a close, it was hoped new lessons could be learnt, and defeat potentially delayed by the insertion of some of these boats into the coastal waters of the United Kingdom. To this end, U-2321 and a few of her sisters were dispatched to the Eastern coast of Scotland.

Design
Like all Type XXIII U-boats, U-2321 had a displacement of  when at the surface and  while submerged. The submarine was powered by one MWM six-cylinder RS134S diesel engine providing , one AEG GU4463-8 double-acting electric motor electric motor providing , and one BBC silent running CCR188 electric motor providing .

U-2321 was fitted with two  torpedo tubes in the bow. She could carry two preloaded torpedoes. The complement was 14–18 men. This class of U-boat did not carry a deck gun.

Service history
The boats were unsuccessful, largely because of the professional nature of veteran Allied naval commanders in their construction of convoys and their preparation of escorts. The North Sea proved largely barren, as most shipping was concentrated in the heavily defended English Channel, as so it was nearly a month after leaving Horten Naval Base in Norway that U-2321 scored her first and only victory, torpedoing the unescorted 1,406 GRT steamship .

Four days later, U-2321 was back in port at Kristiansand, where she was still berthed when Germany surrendered on 9 May. Sailed to Loch Ryan in Scotland, U-2321 was allowed to rust and rot, the decaying hull destroyed as a naval gunfire target on 27 November 1945 along with all the other surrendered Norwegian U-boats.

Summary of raiding history

References

Bibliography

External links
 

World War II submarines of Germany
Type XXIII submarines
Operation Deadlight
U-boats commissioned in 1944
1944 ships
Ships built in Hamburg
Ships sunk as targets
U-boats sunk in 1945
Maritime incidents in November 1945